Beryl Franklin Carroll (March 15, 1860 – December 16, 1939) was the 20th Governor of Iowa from 1909 to 1913. He was the first native-born governor of Iowa.

Biography
Carroll was born in Davis County, Iowa; he graduated from the Missouri State Normal School (now Truman State University) in 1884. He worked as a livestock dealer, teacher, and newspaper publisher. He was a member of the Iowa Senate (1896–1900), postmaster of Bloomfield, Iowa (1898–1903), and Iowa state auditor (1903–09). He was elected Governor in 1908 and reelected in 1910. On November 30, 1910, Governor Carroll was hailed as a hero for entering a burning building in Des Moines and retrieving a trunk containing valuable property. After leaving office, Carroll worked in the life insurance business in Des Moines. He died in Bloomfield, Iowa, and was buried at the Odd Fellows Cemetery in Bloomfield, Iowa.

References

External links

 National Governors Association profile

1860 births
1939 deaths
Republican Party Iowa state senators
Republican Party governors of Iowa
Truman State University alumni
People from Bloomfield, Iowa
Iowa postmasters
State Auditors of Iowa
Politicians from Des Moines, Iowa
Burials in Iowa
19th-century American politicians
20th-century American politicians